Kot Naka is a village of Pindi Bhattian Tehsil 5 km from it on Kot Naka road. It is 2.5 km from Motorway M-3.
Nearest villages are as under
Dera kashmirrian 1km
Chah shadi wala 1.5 km
Fateke 2 km
Thatha Langer 3.5 km

See also
Pindi Bhattian Tehsil
Pindi Bhattian
Thatha Khero Matmal

Hafizabad District
Villages in Hafizabad District